Agua Caliente in Maricopa County, Arizona on the border with Yuma County, is a place north of the Gila River near Hyder, Arizona. Named 'Santa Maria del Agua Caliente' in 1744 by Father Jacob Sedelmayer. In 1775, Father Francisco Garces used the current short form. The location was the site of a resort established at the site of nearby hot springs. Agua Caliente, a name derived from Spanish meaning "hot water", received its name from nearby hot springs which were originally used by the local Indigenous population.

Demographics

Agua Caliente's population was 113 in 1900. Agua Caliente appeared as the Agua Caliente Precinct of Maricopa County on the 1910 U.S. Census. It appeared again in 1920 as Precinct 54 and 1930 simply as Agua Caliente Precinct again. In the latter census, it reported a White majority. With the combination of all Arizona county precincts into 3 districts each in 1940, it did not formally appear again on the census to date. Agua Caliente's population in 1940 was 60.

Flap-Jack Ranch, Grinnell's and Stanwix Station 
By 1858 Flap-Jack Ranch was located six miles from the Agua Caliente hot springs along the Gila River,  from Fort Yuma.  It was established as stagecoach station of the Butterfield Overland Mail.  In 1862, it was called Grinnel's Ranch and was listed on the itinerary of the California Column in the same place as Flap Jack Ranch, (84 miles), from Fort Yuma on the route to Tucson. So too was what Union Army reports called Stanwix Ranch or Stanwix Station which became the site of the westernmost skirmish of the American Civil War. In the early part of the 20th century, the alignment of U.S. Route 80 in Arizona passed in front of the property, increasing traffic and making it a tourist stop on the cross national highway, until the road bypassed the area.

Agua Caliente Ranch
John Ross Browne described his visit to the Agua Caliente Springs from Grinnel's Station in 1864:

In 1873, Agua Caliente Ranch, still owned by King S. Woolsey, had become well known and visited by many people.  A resort was built there in 1897 with 22 rooms and a swimming pool in which the hot waters from the spring collected for the use of the visitors. The remains of the hotel has survived into the present but the hot springs dried up as ground water was pumped out for irrigation.

Some of the acreage is currently farmed; most of it is in its natural undisturbed state. There are also ruins of an old stone house, an old store and other old buildings in various states of decay.

See also

 List of historic properties in Agua Caliente, Arizona

References

External links

 Ghosttowns.com, Maricopa County, Agua Caliente
  Flap Jack Stage Station, c. 1900 From Sharlot Hall Museum, Photographs, Buildings – Stage Stations
 Agua Caliente – Ghost Town of the Month at azghosttowns.com

Ghost towns in Arizona
Butterfield Overland Mail in New Mexico Territory
American frontier
Stagecoach stops in the United States
History of Arizona
1858 establishments in New Mexico Territory
Hot springs of Arizona
Former populated places in Maricopa County, Arizona
Bodies of water of Maricopa County, Arizona